Welcome to Our Christmas Party is the debut full-length studio album of Christmas music by Band of Merrymakers, released on October 23, 2015, through Sony Masterworks. The album features seven original songs written by members of the group and renditions of four traditional Christmas songs.

Track listing
Sources: Amazon.com and AllMusic

Personnel
Credits adapted from AllMusic

Featured artists
 Alex & Sierra — vocals
 Natasha Bedingfield — vocals
 Firekid — vocals
 Michael Fitzpatrick — vocals
 Tyler Glenn — vocals
 Kevin Griffin — guitar, bass guitar, keyboards, vocals
 David Ryan Harris — vocals
 Nick Hexum — vocals
 David Hodges — vocals
 Charles Kelley — vocals
 Mark McGrath — vocals
 Andrew McMahon — vocals
 The Mowgli's — vocals
 Owl City — vocals
 Christina Perri — vocals
 Bebe Rexha — vocals
 Sinclair — vocals
 Smallpools — vocals
 The Grand Southern — vocals
 Street Corner Symphony — vocals
 Jason Wade — vocals
 Dan Wilson — vocals

Other musicians
 Courtlan Clement — banjo, acoustic guitar
 Charity Daw — vocals
 Josh Edmondson — drums, guitar, bass guitar, keyboards, vocals
 Jen Hollander — vocals
 Joey Hollander — vocals
 Sam Hollander — drums, vocals
 Dash Hutton — drums
 Grant Michaels — keyboards
 Jamie Moore — guitar, bass guitar, keyboards
 Billy Nobel — keyboards
 Thomas Onebane — guitar, keyboards
 Ben Phillips — drums
 Matthew Puckett — vocals (background)
 Duran Visek — vocals

Technical
 Keith Armstrong — mixing
 Brad Blackwood — mastering
 Reinhardt Creative — creative director
 C. Taylor Crothers — photography
 Josh Edmondson — engineer, production, programming
 Kevin Griffin — engineer, production, programming
 Sam Hollander — production, programming
 Tommy King — engineer, production
 Jennifer Liebeskind — production development
 Grant Michaels — programming
 Jamie Moore — mixing, production, programming
 Winnie Murguia — engineer
 Caitlin Notey — mixing assistant
 Thomas Onebane — production, programming
 Ben Phillips — engineer, mixing
 Will Pugh — vocal engineer
 Megan Reinhardt — creative director
 Pierre-Andre Rigoll — engineer
 David Simoné — executive producer
 Winston Simone — executive producer

Release history

References

2015 Christmas albums
2015 debut albums
Christmas albums by American artists